Kagiso Rabada (born 25 May 1995) is a South African international cricketer who plays all formats of the game. He is a right arm fast bowler. He made his international debut in November 2014 in limited-overs cricket before going on to make his Test debut in November 2015. By January 2018, he had topped both the ICC ODI bowler rankings and the ICC Test bowler rankings aged 22. In July 2018, he became the youngest bowler to take 150 wickets in Tests (23 years and 50 days).

In July 2016, Rabada became the first cricketer to win six awards at Cricket South Africa's (CSA) annual dinner, including the prize for Cricketer of the Year. In June 2018, he again won six awards at CSA's annual dinner, including Cricketer of the Year, Test Cricketer and ODI Cricketer of the Year. In August 2018, Wisden named him the best young player in the world.He is the only bowler who took hat-trick in all three formats of cricket.

Domestic career
Rabada made his debut for the Gauteng in the CSA Provincial One-Day Competition against Border in December 2013.

Rabada was chosen to represent South Africa's Under-19 side for the 2014 ICC Under-19 Cricket World Cup. For the victorious South Africans, he was their best bowler claiming the 2nd most wickets (14) in the tournament at an economy rate of 3.10. He also claimed the best figures of the tournament: 6/25 against Australia A. This led to him being dubbed "the fastest and most feared bowler in the competition".

Rabada's performances in the Under-19 World Cup saw him catapulted into the Lions franchise for their last two games of the Sunfoil Series season. He took 7 wickets for 186 in these two matches.

In February 2015, Rabada took a record 14 wickets in a match for Lions against Dolphins, including 9 for 33 in the second innings. His 14 for 105 are the best figures in the franchise era of South African cricket.

In February 2016, it was announced that Rabada had signed a short-term deal to play county cricket for Kent County Cricket Club in June and July of the English domestic season, passing up the opportunity of an IPL contract to gain experience in English conditions. He played in two County Championship and six T20 matches for the county during his spell in England.

In October 2018, he was named Jozi Stars' squad for the first edition of the Mzansi Super League T20 tournament. In September 2019, he was named in the squad for the Jozi Stars team for the 2019 Mzansi Super League tournament. In April 2021, he was named in Gauteng's squad, ahead of the 2021–22 cricket season in South Africa.

In February 2017, Rabada was bought by the Delhi Daredevils team for the 2017 Indian Premier League for INR 50 million. In January 2018, he was bought again by Delhi (Delhi Capitals) in the 2018 IPL auction but was later ruled out of the season due to a back injury.

He was retained again ahead of 2019 Indian Premier League by Delhi Capitals. He played 12 matches in the league stage before leaving for national duty. He picked up 25 wickets and become the highest wicket taker for DC and overall second highest wicket taker of that season. DC qualified for the playoffs for the first time since 2012 IPL season. In the 2020 Indian premier League, he become the highest wicket taker of the season by picking up 30 wickets in 17 matches he played. In both seasons, Rabada played a vital role in his team's success.

In the 2022 IPL mega auction, Rabada was bought by the Punjab Kings for INR 9.25Cr.

International career

Rabada made his Twenty20 International debut for South Africa against Australia on 5 November 2014.

Rabada made his One Day International debut for South Africa against Bangladesh on 10 July 2015, achieving best figures of 6/16 on debut. He also became only the second player, after Taijul Islam, to take a hat-trick on debut in an ODI match. He made his Test debut for South Africa against India on 5 November 2015. In the fourth Test of England's 2015–16 tour of South Africa, he finished with figures of 13/144 helping his team win the game. In the process, he became the youngest South African to take a ten-wicket haul in a Test, and the figures were his team's second best ever, after Makhaya Ntini's 13/132.

Rabada's first ten-wicket haul in a Test match came in 2016 against England during the 4th Test at Centurion. He took 13 wickets in the match, including two five wicket hauls, and returned his best innings bowling figures of 7/112 in the England first innings. His second ten-wicket haul came in 2017 against Sri Lanka at Cape Town. During the first Test at Lord's in South Africa's 2017 tour of England, Rabada was suspended for the second Test at Trent Bridge following an altercation with Ben Stokes after using "inappropriate language" after dismissing Stokes on the first day.

As well as the five-fors he took in the matches when he took ten wickets,  he had taken a total of five five-wicket hauls in Test matches, the first of which was earlier in England's 2016 tour of South Africa. He repeated the feat in Australia in 2016 at the WACA. He was the man of the match in this fixture.

Rabada took 4/39 in the third ODI match of the South African tour in England in 2017. Following his performance in the match, Rabada became top ranked ODI bowler in the world displacing countryman Imran Tahir as per the ICC ODI bowler rankings and became youngest player (aged 22) to top the ODI rankings since Saqlain Mushtaq in 1998.

During the first test of India's tour of South Africa in 2018 at Newlands, Rabada took 3/34 and 2/41 in the first and second innings. Following his performance in the match, Rabada became top ranked Test bowler in the world as per the ICC Test bowler rankings displacing England bowler James Anderson.

In the second test match against Australia, Rabada took 11 wickets for 150 runs ultimately winning man of the match awards. This performance earned him top spot in ICC Test bowler rankings with 902 points, standing 15 points above James Anderson. He became the fourth South African bowler to cross 900 points after Vernon Philander, Shaun Pollock and Dale Steyn.

In July 2018 during the first test against Sri Lanka, Rabada surpassed the record of Harbhajan Singh to become the youngest ever bowler to take 150 wickets in Test cricket and also became the third fastest South African to reach 150 test wickets in terms of matches (31).

In 2018, he took the most wickets in Tests by any bowler, with 52 dismissals. In March 2019, Rabada took his 100th wicket in ODIs in the second ODI against Sri Lanka. In April 2019, he was named in South Africa's squad for the 2019 Cricket World Cup. Rabada became only the 8th South African bowler to pick 200 Test wickets as Hasan Ali in the 1st Test of the South African tour of Pakistan in 2021.

In September 2021, Rabada was named in South Africa's squad for the 2021 ICC Men's T20 World Cup. On 6 November 2021, in South Africa's final match of the tournament, against England, Rabada became the first bowler for South Africa to take a hat-trick in T20I cricket. In January 2022, Rabada played in his 50th Test match, in the third match of the series against India. On Day 2 of the first test match of the series against England in August 2022, Rabada took his first five-for at Lord's which earned him a place on the coveted honours board. He is only the fourth South African bowler to achieve this feat since re-admission after Allan Donald, Makhaya Ntini and Vernon Philander.

Other ventures 
In 2020 Kagiso Rabada and Cameron Scott founded Kingdom Kome Productions, their first project is a short film called "The Ring of Beasts".

Personal life
Rabada's father is a doctor and his mother Florence is a lawyer. He is of Venda and Tswana ancestry.

See also
 List of One Day International cricket hat-tricks
 List of cricketers who have taken five-wicket hauls on ODI debut

References

External links

 

1995 births
Living people
Alumni of St Stithians College
Cricketers from Johannesburg
South African cricketers
South Africa Test cricketers
South Africa One Day International cricketers
South Africa Twenty20 International cricketers
Cricketers who have taken five wickets on One Day International debut
One Day International hat-trick takers
Cricketers at the 2019 Cricket World Cup
Twenty20 International hat-trick takers
Gauteng cricketers
Lions cricketers
Kent cricketers
Delhi Capitals cricketers
Jozi Stars cricketers
Punjab Kings cricketers